Chris Roberson (born March 3, 1983) is a former American football cornerback. He was drafted by the Jacksonville Jaguars in the seventh round of the 2005 NFL Draft. He played college football at Eastern Michigan.

Roberson was also a member of the Miami Dolphins, Detroit Lions, Philadelphia Eagles, Cleveland Browns and Virginia Destroyers.

Professional career

Philadelphia Eagles
Roberson was signed to the Philadelphia Eagles' practice squad on December 2, 2009.

Cleveland Browns
Roberson was signed to a reserve/future contract by the Cleveland Browns on January 20, 2010.

External links
Just Sports Stats

1983 births
Living people
Players of American football from Detroit
American football cornerbacks
Eastern Michigan Eagles football players
Jacksonville Jaguars players
Miami Dolphins players
Detroit Lions players
Philadelphia Eagles players
Cleveland Browns players
Virginia Destroyers players